In astronomy, the Kraft break refers to the abrupt decrease in stars' average rotation rates at surface temperatures of about 6200 kelvin.  The so-called break bears the name of astronomer Robert Kraft, though its existence was recognized prior to his publications on the topic. The break is understood to separate stars with deep convective envelopes and efficient magnetic dynamos from those without.  The dynamos are thought to maintain magnetic fields that transfer angular momentum to the stellar wind, thus slowing down the star's surface through magnetic braking.  In hot stars the process is less efficient (because the convective envelopes are shallow) so the stars continue to rotate quickly.

References 

Stellar astronomy